The 1926 California gubernatorial election was held on November 2, 1926. C. C. Young had defeated incumbent governor Friend Richardson for the Republican nomination.

General election results

References
 Our Campaigns

California
1926
Gubernatorial
November 1926 events